The 2020 Indonesian Basketball League was the fifth season since the re-branding by Starting5. The regular season began on 10 January 2020 and was suspended on 13 March until 23 June 2020, then both remaining series at the regular season in Yogyakarta (UNY) and Malang, as well as the post season in Jakarta has been cancelled as a result of the COVID-19 pandemic. The season originally resumed and concluded directly with the playoffs on 13 until 27 October 2020 at Mahaka Square, Jakarta. Originally, the playoffs were scheduled to begin on 27 March until 12 April 2020, and end with the Finals in 17 and 18 or 19 April 2020. The All-Star game was played on 9 February 2020, at the GOR UNY, Yogyakarta, and was won by IBL All-Stars, 157–155. There was no official Pre-Season held for this season, however 2019 Indonesia President's Cup that was held from 20 November to 24 November 2019 in Solo, Indonesia was treated as the pre-season.

Teams

Schedule

Transactions

Foreign Players 
Each club in the first divisions will be allowed up to three registered foreign players, excluding one foreign-born player who has become a naturalized Indonesian citizen. Two foreign players will be allowed on the court. Naturalized players can play as Indonesian citizens and have no limitations. Each club will be allowed one naturalized player.

IBL Draft Local Player

1st round

2nd round

Recommended Player round

Preseason 
All games were held in Sritex Arena, Solo

Preliminary round 
All times are local (UTC+7).

Group A

Group B

Group C

Classification round

7th-8th place round

5th-6th-place game

Finals round

Semi-finals

3rd-4th-place game

Final

Individual awards

Regular season 
Source: 

* Indonesia Patriots is the national team, so the team is not able qualified for the play-offs

Championship Series

First Round

Players of the Series

Statistics

Individual game highs

Individual statistic

Individual awards 
Most Valuable Player : Abraham Damar Grahita (Indonesia Patriots)

Foreign Player of the Year : Mike Glover (NSH Jakarta)

Rookie of the Year : Rivaldo Tandra (Satria Muda Pertamina Jakarta) 

Coach of the Year : Antonius Ferry Rinaldo (NSH Jakarta) 

Defensive Player of the Year : Indra Muhammad (Pacific Caesar Surabaya) 

Sixthman of the Year : Arki Wisnu (Indonesia Patriots)

Most Improve Player of the Year :Sandy Ibrahim (Satria Muda Pertamina Jakarta) 

Best Referee of the Year :Harja Jaladri 

2020 All-Indonesian First Team

 G: Andakara Prastawa (Indonesia Patriots)
 G: Abraham Damar Grahita (Indonesia Patriots)
 F: Daniel Wenas (Louvre Surabaya)
 F: Kaleb Gemilang (Indonesia Patriots)
 C: Henry Lakay (Satya Wacana Salatiga)

2020 All-Indonesian Second Team

 G: Widyanta Putra Teja (NSH Jakarta)
 G: Abraham Wenas (Amartha Hangtuah)
 F: Sandy Ibrahim (Satria Muda Pertamina Jakarta)
 F: Govinda Saputra (Pelita Jaya Jakarta)
 F: Arki Wisnu (Indonesia Patriots)

2020 All-Indonesian Third Team

 G: Yerikho Tuasela (Pacific Caesar Surabaya)
 G: Nuke Saputra (Bima Perkasa Jogja)
 F: Diftha Pratama (Prawira Bandung)
 F: Indra Muhammad (Pacific Caesar Surabaya)
 F: Juan Laurent Kokodiputra (Satria Muda Pertamina Jakarta)

2020 All-Indonesian Defensive Team

 
 
 

2020 All-Rookie Team 

 PG
 SG
 SF 
 SG/SF
 C

All-Star Games

Pre-game 
Skill-challenge champion :  Team 4: Dimaz Muharri, Mei Joni, Antoni Erga

Three-point contest champion :  Christopher V. Sterling | Satya Wacana Salatiga

Slam-dunk contest champion :  Laquavious Kashaka Cotton  | Amartha Hangtuah

Game

Indonesia Patriots

IBL All Star

All-Star MVP

Playoffs

MVP 
not awarded

References

External links 

 Official Website

2019–20 in Asian basketball leagues
2019 in Indonesian sport
2020 in Indonesian sport
Basketball in Indonesia
IBL Indonesia